Bishop McNamara High School (often referred to as Bishop Mac, McNamara, or Mac) is a private, Roman Catholic high school in Kankakee, Illinois.  It is located in the Roman Catholic Diocese of Joliet in Illinois.

History
In 1921, the cornerstone was laid for St. Patrick High School, nearly 30 years after the founding of St. Patrick parish in Kankakee. In the fall of 1922, Father Henry M. Shea opened the parish high school.  Under the direction of the Sisters of Loretto at the Foot of the Cross, classes were conducted in the grade school building until the final phase of the high school building was completed.  St. Patrick High, the only Catholic co-educational high school in this area, was formally dedicated on November 12, 1923.

The first graduates in 1925 were all commercial students.  By 1926, there were 112 students enrolled in both business and academic courses.  In 1931, the Clerics of St. Viator assumed charge of St. Patrick Parish, and for 25 years the Viatorians and Sisters of Loretto educated students at the school on Hickory Street in Kankakee.

By the early 1950s, the school was bulging with more than 300 students and it was apparent that a new site was needed.  Dorothy and Roy Hammes provided the funds to purchase property for the new school. No longer a parish school, the name was changed to St. Patrick Central, and served students from 16 parishes in the Kankakee area.

In little more than 10 years, enrollment had once again outgrown the facility. The closing of St. Joseph Seminary would add to the student body, and in 1963, through the generosity of Mr. and Mrs. Roy Hammes, construction began on the rectangle addition to the circular building.  In the 1964-65 school year, the new addition was opened, and the name changed to Bishop McNamara High School in honor of the first bishop of the Joliet diocese, who had been instrumental in the central school's development.

The Clerics of St. Viator administered the school until 1981, when, because of a growing shortage of priests, they had to discontinue their commitment. Viatorian priest Father Erwin Savela was hired as principal of Bishop McNamara High School and continued in that position until 1988.  David Raiche was principal for one year, and then in 1990, the Order of St. Augustine assumed administration of the school.  After 10 years, once again because of the decreasing number of priests available, the Augustinians ended their contract with Bishop McNamara High School and James Laurenti was named principal.

In 2008, Kurt Weigt became principal and the word Catholic was added to the school's title to further promote religious beliefs.  In 2012, former staff member and alum Terry Granger was hired as principal. Bishop McNamara Catholic continues as the only Catholic high school in three counties.  Priests from area parishes served by the school celebrate Mass regularly and assist with liturgies.  Alumni, parents, friends, faculty and students continue to “Stand Together” as the school enters its 90th year of providing Christian-based education.

Academics
Graduation requirements consist of the accumulation of twenty-three academic credits and sixty hours of approved community service. Credits must be accumulated in the subjects of Religion, English language and literature, Mathematics, Physical and Chemical Sciences, Social and Historical studies, Modern Language/Fine Arts/Vocational studies, and Elective classes. With the number of credits required per subject ranging from two (Sciences, Social and Historical studies, and Modern Language/Fine Arts/Vocational studies) to six (Elective classes).

The school currently offers Advanced Placement courses in English Literature, Chemistry, Spanish Language, United States History, Macroeconomics, Psychology, Calculus, and Physics.

In addition to its college preparatory curriculum, the school maintains a relationship with the Kankakee Area Career Center which offers students an opportunity to earn credit in industrial technology, with courses ranging from  cosmetology, drafting, firefighting, EMS training, welding, and law enforcement training.

This past year Bishop McNamara is now not only a high school but and junior high and has 2 other buildings for the Pre K-6th. This adjustment made 7th and 8th grades be put in the circle area of the school. So all of the High school students are in the square/rectangle part of Bishop McNamara.

Athletics
The Bishop McNamara Fightin' Irish compete in two conferences.  The men compete in the Metro Suburban Conference (MSC).  The women compete in the East Suburban Catholic Conference (ESCC).  They also compete in the state tournaments sponsored by the Illinois High School Association.  The school currently sponsors teams for men and women in basketball, cross country, golf, soccer, tennis, and track & field.  Men can compete in baseball, football, and wrestling.  Women can compete in softball, cheerleading, and volleyball.  While not supported by the ESCC, nor by the IHSA, the school also sponsors a Pom-pon dance team

The following teams have finished in the top four of their respective IHSA state tournaments:
baseball •• 3rd place (1993—94); 2nd place (1988—89)
basketball (girls) •• 4th place (2007—08) (2009—10) State Champions (2014–15)
cross country (girls) •• 2nd place (1995—96)
football •• 2nd place (1978—79, 1981—82, 1998—99);  State Champions (1982—83, 1985—86, 1986—87, 1987—88, 2015—16)
golf (boys) •• 4th place (1998—99); 3rd place (1995—96); 2nd place (1977—78, 1988—89, 1989—90, 1990—91, 1991—92); State Champions (1992—93, 2000—01)
softball •• 3rd place (2014–15); State Champions (2012-13)
track & field (girls) •• 2nd place (1978—79)
The Pom Dance Team have won first in the state championship five times since 2001 in the Team Dance Illinois State tournament.  They have consistently placed among the top three in their state championship tournament every year they have competed since 2001.  TDI is recognized by the Illinois High School Association (IHSA) and  conducts its competitive and educational programs according to the IHSA and NFHS Spirit Rules
They also have 7th and 8th grade Basket Ball, Girls Basket Ball, Baseball, Softball, Volley Ball, Cross Country, and Track.

Notable alumni

Thomas V. Draude - decorated U.S. Marine officer
Thomas L. Kilbride - former Chief Justice, Supreme Court of the State of Illinois
Alex Storako - softball player
Captain Ryan Beaupre, Class of 1991 - USMC, deceased; first casualty of Operation Iraqi Freedom, March 2003.
Tyjuan Hagler, Class of 2000 -  NFL linebacker, Indianapolis Colts (Super Bowl XLI Champions)
Thomas Guynes, Class of 1993 -  NFL offensive lineman, Arizona Cardinals
Aaron DeGroot, Class of 2011 -  Democratic Union Activist

References

External links
 School Website

Roman Catholic Diocese of Joliet in Illinois
Catholic secondary schools in Illinois
Schools in Kankakee County, Illinois
Educational institutions established in 1964
1964 establishments in Illinois